This is a list of notable lakes and reservoirs located in the U.S. state of Arizona. Many of the lakes listed here contain game fish and are managed by the Arizona Game and Fish Department. Some may dry out or freeze out fish, and require seasonal restocking. Most lakes will not allow large motorboats.

Due to Arizona's dry climate, many listed here are intermittent lakes and do not contain water throughout the entire year.

List of Arizona lakes 
Alamo Lake
Ackre Lake
Apache Lake
Ashurst Lake
Bartlett Lake
Bear Canyon Lake
Becker Lake
Bekihatso
Big Lake
Black Canyon Lake
Blue Ridge Reservoir
Bunch Reservoir
Canyon Lake
Carnero Lake
Cataract Lake
Chevelon Canyon Lake
Childs-Irving Hydroelectric Facilities (Stehr Lake)

Clear Creek Reservoir
Cluff Ranch Ponds
Coconino Reservoir
Concho Lake
Crescent Lake

Dankworth Pond
Deadhorse Lake
Dogtown Reservoir

Earl Park Lake
Fain Lake
Fool Hollow Lake
Frye Mesa Reservoir
Goldwater Lake
Granite Basin Lake

Lake Havasu
Hawley Lake
Horseshoe Cienega Lake
Horseshoe Lake
Horsethief Basin Lake
Hulsey Lake

Imperial Reservoir
J. D. Dam Lake
Kaibab Lake
Kennedy Lake
Kinnikinick Lake
Knoll Lake
Lake Havasu
Lake Mead
Lake Mohave
Lake Powell
Lee Valley Lake
Long Lake
Luna Lake
Lyman Reservoir
Lynx Lake

Martinez Lake
Lake Mary (Lower)
Lake Mary (Upper)
McClelland Lake

Mittry Lake
Mormon Lake
Nelson Reservoir

Painted Rock Reservoir
Parker Canyon Lake
Patagonia Lake
Pecks Lake (Verde Valley)
Peña Blanca Lake
Perkins Tank
Picacho Reservoir
Lake Pleasant Regional Park (Lake Pleasant)
Lake Powell
Rainbow Lake
Red Lake, on the border with New Mexico

Riggs Flat Lake
River Reservoir

Roper Lake
Rose Canyon Lake
Russel Tank
Saguaro Lake

San Carlos Lake
Santa Fe Lake
Scott Reservoir
Show Low Lake

Soldiers Annex Lake
Soldiers Lake
Stoneman Lake

Tempe Town Lake
Theodore Roosevelt Lake

Topock Marsh

Tunnel Reservoir
Watson Lake
Whitehorse Lake

White Mountain Lake
Willcox Playa

Willow Springs Lake
Woodland Reservoir
Woods Canyon Lake

Metropolitan Phoenix  lakes 
There are 18 lakes in the Urban Lake system. They are stocked with sports fish seasonally.

Alvord Lake
Canal
Chaparral Lake
Cortez Lake
Desert Breeze Lake
Desert West
Encanto
Kiwanis Lake
Papago Ponds
Red Mountain
Rio Vista
Riverview
Surprise Lake
Water Ranch

Tucson area lakes 
 Kennedy
 Lakeside
 Sahuarita
 Silverbell

Town of Payson lakes
Green Valley Lake

References

External links

Arizona Game and Fish
Arizona Lake Levels
AZ Lakes

Lakes
Arizona